Reve d'Essor (Japanese レーヴディソール, foaled 8 April 2008) is a Japanese Thoroughbred racehorse and broodmare. She was the best juvenile filly in Japan in 2010 when she was unbeaten in three races including the Daily Hai Nisai Stakes and Hanshin Juvenile Fillies. She won the Tulip Sho on her three-year-old debut before her career was disrupted by injury. She failed to recapture her best form in two subsequent races and was retired from racing at the end of the year.

Background
Reve d'Essor is a grey mare bred in Hokkaido by Northern Farm. During her racing career she carried the black, yellow, pink and red colours of Sunday Racing and was trained by Hiroyoshi Matsuda. She was ridden in all of her races by Yuichi Fukunaga.

She was from the seventh crop of foals sired by the undefeated Agnes Tachyon who won the Satsuki Sho in 2001. He went on to become a successful breeding stallion whose other foals included Deep Sky, Daiwa Scarlet, Logic (NHK Mile Cup), Captain Thule (Satsuki Sho) and Little Amapola (Queen Elizabeth II Commemorative Cup).

Reve d'Essor's dam Reve d'Oscar showed top class form in Europe, winning the Prix Saint-Alary in 2000. After being exported to Japan she became a successful broodmare whose other foals included the Aoba Sho winner Reve Mistral. She was a full-sister to Reve d'Iman, the dam of Bethrah.

Racing career

2010: two-year-old season
Reve d'Essor began her racing career in a 1500 metre contest for previously unraced juveniles at Sapporo Racecourse on 11 September. She started favourite against thirteen opponents and won from Northern River, a colt who went on to win the Arlington Cup and the Capella Stakes. On 16 October at Kyoto Racecourse the filly was stepped up in class for the Grade 2 Daily Hai Nisai Stakes over 1600 metres and went off the 1.4/1 favourite in a twelve-runner field. She was only eighth on the final turn but finished strongly to win by one and a quarter lengths and a length from the colts Admire Sagace and Meisho Naruto. Grand Prix Boss who was voted Japan's champion two-year-old colt, finished seventh. She became the first filly to win the race since Seeking The Pearl in 1996.

Reve d'Essor made her first appearance in all-female competition on 12 December when she contested the Grade 1 Hanshin Juvenile Fillies over 1600 metres at Hanshin Racecourse. She was made the 0.6/1 favourite against seventeen opponents including Dance Fantasia (unbeaten in two races), Aventura, Whale Capture, Meine Isabel (Niigata Nisai Stakes) and Marumo Sarah (Fairy Stakes). As in her previous starts, Reve d'Essor came from well off the pace with a strong late run (described as an "explosive charge") and won by a length from Whale Capture.

In the official ratings for Japanese two-year-olds Reve d'Essor was rated the best juvenile filly of the year, two pounds ahead of Whale Capture and four pounds below the top-rated colt Grand Prix Boss. In January 2011 Reve d'Essor was unanimously awarded the JRA Award for Best Two-Year-Old Filly at the JRA Awards for 2010, receiving all 285 of the votes.

2011: three-year-old season
On 5 March at Hanshin, Reve d'Essor made her debut in the 1600 metres Tulip Sho, a race which serves as a trial for the Oka Sho. Starting at odds of 1/10 she was restrained as usual in the early stages before taking the lead in the straight and drawing away to win by easily four lengths from Rice Terrace. Later that month the filly sustained a leg injury in training and was off the track until autumn.

After an absence of months six months Reve d'Essor returned at Kyoto in November to contest the Queen Elizabeth II Commemorative Cup, a race which saw her pitted against older fillies and mares for the first time. She started the 6.3/1 third favourite but never looked likely to win and suffered her first defeat as she came home eleventh of the eighteen runners, almost nine lengths behind the winner Snow Fairy. On 18 December Reve d'Essor was made odds-on favourite for the Aichi Hai over 2000 metres at Kokura Racecourse, but finished fourth behind Fumino Imagine.

In the Japanese rankings for 2011, Reve d'Essor was rated the second best three-year-old filly, four pounds behind Aventura.

Breeding record
After her retirement from racing, Reve d'Essor became a broodmare. As of 2019, she had produced five foals:

Alabaster, a grey colt, foaled in 2013, sired by Harbinger. Won one race.
Reve de la Mere grey filly, 2016, by Lord Kanaloa. Failed to win in two races.
Reve du Roi, bay colt, 2017, by King Kamehameha.
unnamed bay filly, 2018, by King Kamehameha.
unnamed grey filly, 2019, by Lord Kanaloa.

Pedigree

References

2008 racehorse births
Racehorses bred in Japan
Racehorses trained in Japan
Thoroughbred family 1-p